Events in the year 1856 in Nicaragua.

Incumbents
President: Patricio Rivas (de jure), William Walker (de facto)

Events

Births

Deaths

References

 
Years in Nicaragua